Saint-Sauveur-de-Montagut (Vivaro-Alpine: Sant Sauvador de Montagut) is a commune of the Ardèche department in southern France.

The rivers Eyrieux, Glueyre and Auzène flow through the town.

Sights
Ruins of an early-medieval castle (which was used as a watch tower/outpost) on one of the hills are the main historical remnant of what is one of France's most sparsely populated areas.

Population

Culture
Protestantism is strong in the town, with the town having both a Protestant temple and a Roman Catholic church.

Economy
Saint-Sauveur-de-Montagut had quite a large textile industry, but in modern times there are hardly any factories left. However, a medium-sized plant nursery now exists, along with a nursing home, a mineral water producer, a comprehensive school and an ice-cream factory.

Tourism
In the summer months many tourists, mainly from the Netherlands, flock to the town where attractions such as la Plage (an artificial beach), a canoe-kayak centre and various paths for hiking/walking make the town a very good tourist spot. There are also two camp sites in the town, one in the outskirts and one in the small suburb of le Moulinon. There are also tourist cottages and other settlements such as the hamlet Maléon which also make up the town.

Further reading
1. Saint-Sauveur-de-Montagut, Evolution D'Une Petite Commune Rurale en Ardèche, Elie Reynier 1996 (Editions Empire & Royaume: Valence)

See also
Communes of the Ardèche department

References

Communes of Ardèche
Ardèche communes articles needing translation from French Wikipedia